WWF King of the Ring is a professional wrestling video game based on the World Wrestling Federation (WWF), released in 1993 for the Nintendo Entertainment System and Game Boy. It was the final WWF game released for the NES, and third WWF game released for the Game Boy. In this game, players can vie for the title of King of the Ring by competing in an eight-man single elimination tournament. Additionally, players can battle the entire roster through a string of singles matches to become WWF Champion. Also available are exhibition matches in singles and tag team modes for one or two players.

Gameplay
The NES version features eleven wrestlers: Hulk Hogan, Randy Savage, Bret Hart, The Undertaker, Shawn Michaels, Razor Ramon, Bam Bam Bigelow, Yokozuna, Mr. Perfect, "The Narcissist" Lex Luger, and "You" (a generic wrestler that the player can name and assign attributes for). Undertaker and Bigelow are not in the Game Boy version.

Each of the game's wrestlers possess the same basic moveset, consisting of punches, kicks, a body slam, a suplex, a throw, a dropkick, stomps, elbow drops, and a move off the turnbuckle. There are no signature moves. However, each wrestler varies in speed, strength, and stamina attributes.

Critical reception
When the NES version was released, Electronic Gaming Monthly gave the review scores of 8, 6, 6, and 7 out of 10. Ed Semrad, who gave the highest score, wrote, "...There are lots of wrestlers to pick from, each being quite different from the other. Being only a two-button game does not really hinder it from being fun, but being on an 8-bit system does have its limitations -- like the occasional character [having his] legs disappearing when thrown...". Sushi-X wrote, "...The graphics are weak and lots of flicker gets annoying real fast. The game play is decent and the cart proves to be fun with two players".

However, public consensus was slightly lower, with player reviews on GameSpot averaging 6.5 out of ten.

Development
WWF King of the Ring was the last NES/GB game made by Gray Matter.

See also
List of licensed wrestling video games
List of fighting games

References

1993 video games
Acclaim Entertainment games
Game Boy games
LJN games
Nintendo Entertainment System games
WWE video games
King of the Ring
Professional wrestling games
Video games developed in the United States